Chucri Zaidan (October 29 , 1891 – September 16, 1980) was a medical doctor in Brazil. He was born in the Ottoman Empire.

Biography
Chucri Zaidan was born in Damascus, Ottoman Empire on 29 October 1891 and then migrated to Brazil in 1925, leaving Syria. He settled in São Paulo. He became a naturalized Brazilian.

Zaidan studied in the Medical Sciences College of the American University of Beirut and graduated as a physician in 1916. He was one of the first foreign physicians to revalidate his diploma in Brazil where he practised obstetric medicine in Hospital Pró-Mater. He became popular for looking after the poor for free; his popularity led to his receiving in 1966 the title of Paulistano Citizen of the Municipal Chamber of São Paulo.

In his honor, the Avenida Ao Longo do Dreno do Brooklin received the name Doutor Chucri Zaidan through the Executive Order no. 18,226 of 22 September 1982.

A metro station is also named after him.

References

1891 births

1980 deaths
Brazilian physicians
Syrian emigrants to Brazil

People from São Paulo